Aníbal Segundo González Espinoza (born 13 March 1964 in Rapel, Cardenal Caro Province) is a retired Chilean footballer who played as a forward during his career.

González is the all-time goalscorer of the Chilean club O'Higgins, with a total of 117 goals at official competitions.

International career
González  represented Chile in the 1987 Pan American Games, winning the silver medal.

At senior level, he made his debut for the Chile national football team on June 5, 1988, in a friendly against the United States national football team.

Personal life
He is better known by his nickname Tunga González.

He is the father of the former footballer of the same name Aníbal González Ramírez, who was born in Monterrey, Mexico.

Honours

Club
Universidad Católica
Primera División de Chile: 1997 Apertura

Colo-Colo
Recopa Sudamericana: 1992
Copa Interamericana: 1992

International
Chile B
 Pan American Games Silver medal: 1987

Individual

O'Higgins
Copa Chile: Top Scorer 1990 (13 goals)
Colo-Colo
Primera División de Chile: Top Scorer 1992 (24 goals)
Palestino
Primera División de Chile: Top Scorer 1995 (18 goals)

References

External links

Aníbal González at MemoriaWanderers 

1964 births
Living people
People from Cardenal Caro Province
Chilean footballers
Chilean expatriate footballers
Chile international footballers
O'Higgins F.C. footballers
Cobreloa footballers
Unión Española footballers
Colo-Colo footballers
Atlético Morelia players
C.F. Monterrey players
Club Deportivo Palestino footballers
Club Deportivo Universidad Católica footballers
Puerto Montt footballers
Santiago Wanderers footballers
Tercera División de Chile players
Chilean Primera División players
Primera B de Chile players
Liga MX players
Chilean expatriate sportspeople in Mexico
Expatriate footballers in Mexico
Association football forwards
1991 Copa América players